Roberto Fernández may refer to:

Arts and Entertainment
Roberto Fernández Beyró (1909–1991), Argentine restaurateur and food critic
Roberto Fernández Retamar (1930–2019), Cuban poet
Roberto Fernández Sastre (born 1951), Uruguayan writer
Roberto G. Fernández (born 1951), Cuban novelist
Roberto Fernández Canuto (born 1973), Spanish director

Sportspeople

Association football
Roberto Fernández (footballer, born 1954), Paraguayan footballer
Robert Fernández (footballer), Spanish footballer
Roberto Fernandez (footballer, born 1971), Indian footballer
Roberto Fernández (footballer, born 1979), Spanish footballer
Gatito Fernández (born 1988), Paraguayan footballer
Roberto Fernández (Bolivian footballer) (born 1999), Bolivian footballer
Roberto Fernández (footballer, born 2000), Paraguayan football defender
Roberto Fernández (footballer, born 2002), Spanish football attacking midfielder

Other sports
José Roberto Fernández Filho (born 1980), Brazilian equestrian

See also
Roberto Hernández (disambiguation)
Rober Bodegas (born 1982), Spanish comedian born Roberto Fernández Cancela